Samuel Sharpe (1801-1832) was a slave leader in Jamaica.

Samuel Sharpe may also refer to:

Samuel Sharpe (burgess) (fl. 1619-1623), English colonist and member of Virginia House of Burgesses
Samuel Sharpe (scholar) (1799–1881), English Unitarian Egyptologist and translator of the Bible
Samuel Sharpe (cricketer) (1839–1924), English cricketer
Samuel Simpson Sharpe (1873–1918), Canadian lawyer and political figure in Ontario

See also 
 Samuel Sharp (disambiguation)